Melastiza chateri is a species of apothecial fungus belonging to the family Pyronemataceae.

This European species appears all year as smooth, dull orange-red disks up to 15 mm in diameter on damp sandy soil.

References

Melastiza chateri at Species Fungorum

Pezizales
Fungi described in 1872